María de Guadalupe "Lupita" Jones Garay (born 6 September 1967) is a Mexican television producer, model, actress, and beauty queen who was crowned Miss Universe 1991. She was the first Mexican contestant for the first time to win all mayor international beauty pageants.

Since 1994, Jones has been the national director of the Mexican division of the Mexicana Universal franchise. To date, she has produced two Miss Universe titleholders, Ximena Navarrete (2010) and Andrea Meza (2020).

Jones was a candidate for the governorship of Baja California in the 2021 Mexican gubernatorial elections.

Education
Lupita Jones got her business administration degree before becoming Miss Universe and also did postgraduate studies in industrial administration at the Centro de Enseñanza Técnica y Superior at her native city of Mexicali, Baja California.

Pageantry

Señorita Mexico
In September 1990, Jones won the title of Señorita México representing the state of Baja California.

Miss Universe
On 17 May 1991, Jones competed against 72 contestants for the title of Miss Universe 1991 at Las Vegas, Nevada representing Mexico. She advanced to the semifinals of the event as first place. 

Jones was the only contestant with an average score above 9. During the final stage, Jones won every single round of competition: swimsuit, interview and evening gown. She dominated the next two rounds of competition (the Top 6 judges' questions and the Top 3 final question), and won the crown, the prizes and the Miss Universe title for her country.

TV producer
After ending her reign in 1992, she started the company Promocertamen in 1994 with Televisa to produce Nuestra Belleza México, the Mexico's official pageant responsible to choose Mexico's delegates for Miss Universe, Miss World and Miss International. This new pageant was created when Señorita México was moved to another TV network, TV Azteca.

In 1997, she attempted to launch the first male-only beauty contest, El Modelo México, but the show got little attention from the public.

In 2001, for the Nuestra Belleza México show, Lupita Jones launched the report her campaign which invited the public to report beautiful women in their state. Critics attacked the campaign on discrimination charges. She produced a winner at one of the 3 most well-known beauty pageants in the planet since 1960: Priscila Perales, Miss International 2007 and another one in 2009 with Anagabriela Espinoza, Miss International 2009. In 2010, a Mexican woman was crowned as Miss Universe 2010, Ximena Navarrete. Accordingly, Jones promised she would vacate the direction of Nuestra Belleza México once a new Mexican Miss Universe would be entitled, but did not follow through after Navarrete won the title.

From 2008 to 2014, Lupita Jones and longtime pageant director-rival Osmel Sousa were brought together to judge Nuestra Belleza Latina, a beauty pageant-related reality television series created by the US Hispanic network Univision, which searches for young women of Latin American descent across the United States.

In 2015, in response to negative comments on Mexicans by Donald Trump, part-owner of the Miss Universe organization, as head of Nuestra Belleza México, Jones endorsed withdrawal of the 2015 contestant from Mexico and urged a boycott of products associated with the 2015 pageant.

Humanitarian causes
In 1999, Lupita Jones decided that the contest would support an important program for ill-treated girls in the country through the Integral Family Development project.

In 2000, Jones accepted an appointment as UNFPA Goodwill Ambassador and Face to Face Campaign Spokesperson for Mexico.

Filmography

Telenovelas

Books

References

External links

Miss Universe Official Website

21st-century Mexican actresses
Actresses from Baja California
Living people
1967 births
Mexican beauty pageant winners
Mexican female models
Mexican people of English descent
Mexican telenovela actresses
21st-century Mexican businesswomen
21st-century Mexican businesspeople
Miss Universe 1991 contestants
Miss Universe winners
Models from Baja California
People from Mexicali
Beauty queen-politicians
20th-century Mexican businesswomen
20th-century Mexican businesspeople